William Nye may refer to:

 Bill Nye (William Sanford Nye, born 1955), American science educator, comedian, television host and mechanical engineer
 Will Nye, American television actor in Murder, She Wrote 1988–1991
 William Foster Nye (1824–1910), businessman who founded Nye Lubricants in 1844
 William B. Nye, former member of the 107th and 108th Ohio General Assembly 1967–1970
 William M. Nye (1829–1905), member of the Wisconsin State Assembly
 William Nye (official) (born 1966), Secretary-General of the Archbishops' Council
 William Nigh (1881–1955), American filmmaker, sometimes credited as "William Nye"

See also

 
 
 
 Bill Knight (disambiguation)
 Bill Nye (disambiguation)
 Bill Nigh (disambiguation)
 Bill Nighy, English actor